Neckarwestheim Nuclear Power Station is a nuclear power plant in Neckarwestheim, Germany, sometimes abbreviated GKN (for ), operated by EnBW Kernkraft GmbH, a subsidiary of EnBW.

GKN 1
Unit I, in service since 1976, carried a nominal electrical power of 840 megawatts. The 50 Hz three phase AC power was 567 megawatts and for the 16.7 Hz traction current power 174 MW. The traction current generator is the world's largest single-phase AC generators. The generator block 1 is rated 21,000 volts at a current of 27,000 amperes, and the traction current generator is rated 14,500 volts and a current of 12,000 amperes. The current produced by the generators was stepped up to 220 kilovolts (three-phase alternating current) or 110 kilovolts (single-phase traction current) with the unit transformers. Unit I was the only nuclear power station which produced traction current. Block I was shut down on 17 March 2011, for a three-month moratorium on nuclear power, an announcement on 30 May 2011 named block I as a unit that would not be returning to service for political reasons.

GKN 2
Block 2, in service since 1988, has a nominal electrical power of 1400 megawatts. The generator produces 50 Hz three-phase alternating current with a voltage of 27,000 V and a current of 35,000 amperes. Unlike Unit 1, no dedicated traction current generation takes place, but some of the power produced is converted at the traction current substation. This is transmitted through the 380 kV generator transformer block of the II and the 380 kV-machine transformer of the motor-generator sets.

Traction current converter plant

The GKN station has a 16.7 Hz traction current converter plant. It is close to the switchgear of block II, has two identical sets, consisting of a three-phase 50 Hz AC motor with 12 poles and a four pole single phase 16.7 Hz AC synchronous generator. The rated voltage of the three-phase AC asynchronous machine and the traction current machine is 12.5 kV. The set has a length of 17.5 meters and a maximum width of 7 meters. The nominal power rating for each set is 70 megawatts, which are the largest traction current motor-generator sets ever built. It feeds the 110 kV balanced line traction power network through appropriate transformers. Power can be transferred from the  Block II nuclear generator over the 380 kV transmission network.

As of 2011, there was a traction current inverter with a transmission rate of 140 MW under construction. It uses GTOs manufactured by ABB.

Dimensions
Dimensions of the outer concrete building of the double-containment are height of around 54,5 m and diameter of around 67 m.

Cooling towers

In order to avoid overheating of the river Neckar, both blocks have cooling towers. These are not built in the usual way. Block I uses two rows of cell cooling towers. Each row has a length of 186.8 meters and a height of 18 meters. Block II uses a hybrid cooling tower with a height of 51.22 meters. It was originally going to use a wet cooling tower, but later it was decided to use dry cooling towers because it would have less effect on the environment though more expensive. This unique type of cooling tower causes the unique shape seen in pictures.

Hybrid cooling tower
Overall height: 51.22 m
overall height over basin level: 48.0 m
mouth diameter: 160.0 m
basin diameter: 120.0 m
chimney height: 24.97 m
air outlet diameter: 73.6 m
cooling performance: 2500 MW

Malfunctions

In 1977, Unit I had the second most serious incident of a nuclear power plant in the German Federal Republic to that date. Numerous errors of a new crew led to damage of the secondary cycle and, at the same time, a defect of a valve led to an  automatic reactor shutdown.

On 27 July 2004, water contaminated with two megabecquerels leaked unnoticed from Unit II into the Neckar river. As a result, for the first time in the Federal Republic, the operator company of a nuclear power plant paid a fine of €25,000 and a managing director was dismissed.

Powerlines

Power produced at GKN is transmitted over a transmission line carrying two circuits of traction current and three-phase alternating current line to the 220 kV-three phase AC and the 110 kV-traction current switchyard situated east of Neckarwestheim. This line is hung on pylons of unusual design with five cross beams. On the lowest cross bar there are two traction current circuits, while the second, third and fourth cross beam carry the three-phase circuits. These are operated, in the case of the GKN 1, with 220 kV and in the case of the GKN 2 with 380 kV. On the highest cross beam two ground conductors are installed. It is notable that the traction current circuits were insulated for 220 kV, although they are operated only with 110 kV. This measure was taken because, in case of a disturbance of the parallel 380 kV-line, overvoltages can occur which insulation designed for 110 kV cannot stand.

The traction current lines from the GKN to the traction current switching station at Neckarwestheim, and from there to the central substation in Stuttgart Zazenhausen, are implemented as four-bundle conductors.

The three-phase 380 kV circuit leading away from the nuclear power station GKN 2 runs past the 220 kV-three phase switchyard at Neckarwestheim to the transformer station at Großgartach near Heilbronn. another 110 kV-line for three phase AC with one circuit which originates in the switchgear of the coal-fired power station at Walheim also runs to the GKN. This line is not for export of the power produced by the GKN, but for start-up power for the nuclear plant.

Neckarwestheim and the GKN have never had a track connection to the railway network.

Public opposition
Geologist Hermann Behmel was a prominent opponent of the Neckarwestheim Nuclear Power Plant.

In April 2009, anti-nuclear activists blocked the entrance to the controversial Neckarwestheim Nuclear Plant with an 8-metre wall. Their protest coincided with the annual meeting of the company that runs the plant, Energie Baden-Württemberg (EnBW).

References

EnBW
Nuclear power stations in Germany
Buildings and structures in Heilbronn (district)
Economy of Baden-Württemberg